The Faculty of Exact and Natural Sciences (Facultad de Ciencias Exactas y Naturales; FCEN), commonly and informally known as Exactas, is the natural science school of the University of Buenos Aires, the largest university in Argentina.

It occupies several buildings of the Ciudad Universitaria complex in the Núñez neighbourhood of Buenos Aires. The computer science, mathematics and physics departments occupy the Pabellón 1, while the other departments are located at the Pabellón 2. Other building at the complex are also used for its academical and research activities such as the Pabellón de Industrias with the Faculty of Engineering or are wholly dedicated to research institutes operated in conjunction with Argentina's national research council CONICET (see list below).

Academic departments
Department of Atmospheric and Ocean Sciences
Department of Computer Science
Department of Physics
Department of Geology
Department of Mathematics
Department of Biological Chemistry
Department of Inorganic, Analytic and Physical Chemistry
Department of Organic Chemistry
Department of Physiology, Molecular and Cellular Biology
Department of Ecology, Genetics and Evolution
Department of Biodiversity and Experimental Biology
Department of Industries
Institute of Biochemical Investigations

Other academic units
CEFIEC
Institute of Calculus (IC)

UBA-CONICET Institutes
Institute of Space Astronomy and Physics (IAFE)
Centre of Investigations of the Sea and Atmosphere (CIMA)
Centre of Investigations of Carbohydrates (CIHIDECAR)
Institute of Physical-Chemistry of Materials, Environment and Energy (INQUIMAE)
Institute of Physiology, Molecular Biology and Neuro-Sciences (IFIBYNE)
Institute of Physics of Plasma (INFIP)
Institute of Geochronology and Isotropic Geology (INGEIS)
Microanalysis and Physical Methods Unit in Organic Chemistry (UMYMFOR)

CONICET associated
Institute of Genetic Engineering and Molecular Biology (INGEBI)

Master degrees
 Atmospheric Sciences
 Oceanography
 Biological Sciences
This Master´s degree Programme consists of three stages:  1) the Common Basic Cycle (CBC), as required for all careers at the University of Buenos Aires,  2) the Basic Professional Cycle of Biological Sciences (CPB) and 3) the Superior  Professional Cycle (CPS). The CPB, which comprises 13 subjects, concentrates all the scientist's basic training. The CPS consists of 10 subjects (or 9 subjects and a bachelor's thesis) and is carried out in the orientation chosen by the student. Different from the CPB, the CPS curriculum is not rigid, but each student must agree on a study plan under the guidance of a teacher (Study Plan´s Tutor).

The subjects of the complete Study plan and the corresponding requirement of study hours can be found here "Plan de Estudio":
 Computer Sciences
 Physical Sciences
 Geological Sciences
 Mathematical Sciences
 Chemical Sciences
 Paleontology

Postgraduate degrees
The School also offers Masters of Science and Ph.D. degrees.

See also
 Science and technology in Argentina
 List of universities in Argentina

References

University of Buenos Aires
Scientific organisations based in Argentina
Educational organizations established in 1891
1891 establishments in Argentina